Coelodasys is a genus of prominent moths in the family Notodontidae. There are at least four described species in Coelodasys, found in North America.

Species
These four species belong to the genus Coelodasys:
 Coelodasys apicalis (Grote & Robinson, 1866) (plain schizura)
 Coelodasys conspecta (Edwards, 1875) 
 Coelodasys errucata (Dyar, 1906)
 Coelodasys unicornis (J. E. Smith, 1797) (unicorn prominent)

References

Notodontidae